The Croatia men's national basketball team represents Croatia in international basketball matches. The team is controlled by the Croatian Basketball Federation (HKS).

The biggest success Croatia has achieved was at the 1992 Barcelona Olympics when the team reached the final against the United States and won the silver medal. Croatia has also won one bronze medal at the FIBA World Cup and two bronze medals at EuroBasket.

Croatia's Krešimir Ćosić, Dražen Petrović, Dino Rađa,  Mirko Novosel and Toni Kukoč are members of the Naismith Memorial Basketball Hall of Fame. Ćosić was inducted in 1996, Petrović in 2002, Rađa in 2018 and Kukoč in 2021, all as players. Novosel was inducted in 2007 as a coach. Petrović, Ćosić, Kukoč and Novosel are members of the FIBA Hall of Fame. Ćosić is also the only Croatian to have received the FIBA Order of Merit. Ćosić, however, never played for the Croatia national team. As he was only a member of the Yugoslavia national team, holding the record for number of medals (including Olyimpic gold) and the most games played by a player.

History

Prior to Croatian independence
Croatia played its first unofficial friendly game on 2 June 1964 in Karlovac. Croatian team played against US All Star Team and lost 65–110 (31–50). USA players coached by Red Auerbach were Bob Cousy, Tom Heinsohn, K. C. Jones, Jerry Lucas, Bob Pettit, Oscar Robertson and Bill Russell and Croatian team was Giuseppe Gjergja, Nemanja Đurić, Živko Kasun, Zlatko Kiseljak, Slobodan Kolaković, Dragan Kovačić, Boris Križan, Stjepan Ledić, Mirko Novosel, Marko Ostarčević, Petar Skansi and Željko Troskot.

Independent Croatia
After independence of Croatia in 1991, the first official tournament played by Croatians were the 1992 Summer Olympics in Barcelona. Croatia defeated the CIS team 75–74 and reached the final against the USA Dream Team led by Michael Jordan. The USA won 85–117, but Croatia won its first medal at a major tournament in history.

The next competition for Croatia was the 1993 EuroBasket in Germany. Tragically, before the tournament Dražen Petrović died in a car accident on 7 June 1993 at the age of 28. Croatia still managed to reach the bronze medal game to defeat Greece 99–59.

Croatia earned its third medal at the 1994 FIBA World Cup in Canada. Croatia lost their semi-finals match against Russia 64–66, but beat Greece once again 78–60 for the bronze medal. A similar occurrence happened at the EuroBasket 1995 in Greece. Croatia lost in the semi-finals 80–90 against Lithuania, but beat Greece 73–68 for the third time in a row in a bronze medal match. That medal to date was the last Croatian medal from any major tournament. At the 1996 Summer Olympics Croatia finished in a subpar seventh place.

Decline
At the EuroBasket 1997 in Spain, the new Croatian generation emerged, but ended in 11th place. Croatia failed to qualify for the 2000, 2004 and 2012 Summer Olympics, but finished sixth in 2008. Croatia also failed to qualify for the 1998, 2002 and 2006 World Cups. Although the team did manage to qualify in 2010, before falling in the Round of 16. However, at the EuroBasket 2013, Croatia had its best tournament appearance since 1995, where the team finished in fourth place.

Honours
The Croatia national team's all-time medal table:

Competitive record

FIBA World Cup

Olympic Games

EuroBasket

Results and fixtures

2022

2023

Team

Current roster
Roster for the EuroBasket 2025 Pre-Qualifiers matches on 23 and 26 February 2023 against Switzerland and Austria.

Depth chart

Head coaches

1990s and 2000s

2010s and 2020s

Past rosters

EuroBasket 1993
EuroBasket 1995
EuroBasket 1997
EuroBasket 1999
EuroBasket 2001
EuroBasket 2003
EuroBasket 2005
EuroBasket 2007
EuroBasket 2009
EuroBasket 2011
EuroBasket 2013
EuroBasket 2015
EuroBasket 2017
EuroBasket 2022

1994 FIBA World Cup
2010 FIBA World Cup
2014 FIBA World Cup

1992 Summer Olympics
1996 Summer Olympics
2008 Summer Olympics
2016 Summer Olympics

Notable players and coaches

Players

Individual awards
 FIBA World Cup All-Tournament Team
 Dino Rađa – 1994
 EuroBasket All-Tournament Team
 Dino Rađa – 1993
 Toni Kukoč – 1995
 Damir Mulaomerović – 2001
 Bojan Bogdanović – 2013
Other notable achievements
 FIBA Order of Merit
 Krešimir Ćosić
 FIBA Hall of Fame
 Krešimir Ćosić
 Dražen Petrović
 Toni Kukoč
 Naismith Memorial Basketball Hall of Fame
 Krešimir Ćosić
 Dražen Petrović
 Dino Rađa
 Toni Kukoč
 Euroscar
 Toni Kukoč – 1991, 1994, 1996, 1998
 Dražen Petrović – 1992, 1993
 Mr. Europa
 Toni Kukoč – 1991, 1992, 1996
 Dražen Petrović – 1993
 NBA champion
 Toni Kukoč – 1996, 1997, 1998
 Žan Tabak – 1995
 NBA Sixth Man of the Year Award
 Toni Kukoč – 1996
 NBA All-Rookie First Team
 Dario Šarić – 2017
 EuroLeague Final Four MVP
 Toni Kukoč – 1993
 EuroLeague Top Scorer
 Zdravko Radulović – 1993
50 Greatest EuroLeague Contributors (2008)
 Krešimir Ćosić
 Dražen Petrović
 Toni Kukoč
 Dino Rađa

Coaches

Individual achievements
 FIBA Hall of Fame
 Mirko Novosel
 Naismith Memorial Basketball Hall of Fame
 Mirko Novosel

Head-to-head record

Record against teams at the EuroBasket

Record against teams in EuroBasket qualification

Record against teams at the World Cup

Record against teams in World Cup qualification

Record against teams at the Olympic Games

Biggest tournament wins
20+ point difference

 Croatia also defeated Albania (94–70) for a win margin of +24 at the 2009 Mediterranean Games.

Biggest tournament losses
-20> point difference

Biggest qualification wins
20+ point difference

See also

Sport in Croatia
Croatia women's national basketball team
Croatia men's national under-20 basketball team
Croatia men's national under-18 and under-19 basketball team
Croatia men's national under-16 and under-17 basketball team

References

External links

 
Croatia FIBA profile
Croatia National Team – Men at Eurobasket.com
Croatia Basketball Records at FIBA Archive

 
Men's national basketball teams